The River and Harbors Act of 1914 expanded the Mississippi River Commission’s jurisdiction to oversee Federal fund distribution to needy States.  The act provided money to affected states each year of the Wilson Administration for the building and maintenance of recommended methods of flood control.  In addition, the act authorized Federal money to be spent on improving various major harbors along the Eastern Seaboard of the United States, most prominently being New York Harbor.  The act also allotted more than $800,000 for the Hudson River banks to be enlarged.

1914 in law
United States federal public land legislation